This is a list of diplomatic missions of Jamaica. Jamaica has a modest number of diplomatic missions in the world, even within its own peripheral region of the Caribbean, and they are maintained under the umbrella of the Ministry of Foreign Affairs and Foreign Trade.

Honorary consulates are excluded from this listing.

Current missions

Africa

Americas

Asia

Europe

Multilateral organizations

Gallery

Closed missions

Africa

Americas

Asia

Europe

Related articles 
 Foreign relations of Jamaica
 List of diplomatic missions in Jamaica
 Visa policy of Jamaica
 Visa requirements for Jamaican citizens

References

External links
Ministry of Foreign Affairs and Foreign Trade of Jamaica

 
Diplomatic missions
Jamaica